Büchlberg (Central Bavarian: Bichlbeag) is a municipality in the district of Passau in Bavaria in Germany.

References

Passau (district)